Anil Rastogi is an Indian theatre, television and film actor. He is known for his roles in Udaan, Ishaqzaade and Na Bole Tum Naa Maine Kuch Kaha.

He has over 600 theatre performances and was a former scientist of the Central Drug Research Institute (CDRI), Lucknow.

Early life 
He was born in Lucknow and completed his schooling from the city, after which he attended Lucknow University for graduate and post-graduate studies. He joined CDRI in 1962 as Junior Research Fellow and retired from the Institute  as Head of Biochemistry and  Directors Grade Scientist in 2003. His doctorate degree is in microbiology.

He is Fellow of National Academy of Sciences of India. He started working in theatre in 1962 and has done more than 1000 shows of 98 plays in Hindi (original or adapted from different Indian or foreign languages) all over the country. He has been secretary of one of the oldest amateur theatre group of India Darpan for more than 38 years.

Career 

Anil Rastogi did several plays across the nation. He worked with eminent theatre directors like late Rajeshwar Bachchan,  late Ravi Baswani, Raj Bisaria,late BV Karanth, late Bansi Kaul,Ajay Kartik, late Urmil Km Thapliyal, late Dina Nath ,Ranjit Kapoor, Surya Mohan Kulshreshtha and others. His main works in theatre, Television and Films are as follows:

Plays 
 Panchhi Jaa, Panchhi Aa (directed by Dina Nath) as Pawan
 Rustam Sohrab as Rustam
 Taj Mahal Ka Tender as Shah Jahan
 Yehoodi Ki Ladki as Yehoodi
 A View From the Bridge as Eddi
Fando and Lis  as Fando
Vibhaas (The Old world) as Protagonist Doctor
Kanya Daan as father
 Bare Foot in Athens as Villan
 Harischannar Ki Ladai as Commissioner
 Kamla as journalist friend
 Tum as Father of Protagonist
Sakharam Binder as Sakharam
Balram Ki Tirtha Yatra as Balram
 Mitra Lead character
 " Bare Foot in Athens 
  "Vibhaas" (adaptation of The Old World) as lead character
  "Tum " as lead character
  "Akhiri Vasant" as lead character and many others

Television 
 Udaan (1989) as SSP Bashir Ahmed
 Biwi Naatiyon Wali 
 Samvidhaan (2014) as Calcutta Member of Parliament, N. Ahmed
 Na Bole Tum Naa Maine Kuch Kaha (season 2) as Purushottam Singh Tilakdhari (2013)
 Razia Sultan (2015)
 Dariba Diaries (2014-2015) as Imam
 Aashram (2020) Webseries as Sunder Lal 
 Shiksha Mandal (2022) Webseries as Umesh Mahajan

 Films 
 Main, Meri Patni Aur Woh (2005)
 Bikroo Kanpur Gangster (2022)
 Ishaqzaade (2012) as Daddu (Parma's grandfather)
 Gaalib (2020) as Bashir Ahmad
 " Z+            ( 2017 ) as Chief Minister of Rajsthan
 Thapppad (2020) as Justice Jaisingh, Netra's father-in-law
 Guddu Rangeela (2015) as Minister
 Raid (2018) as Finance Minister
 Mulk (film) (2018) as Sonkar, Murad Ali's friends
 Nakkash (2019) as Politician 
 Hotel Salvation( Mukti Bhawan ) (2017)as Manager of Mukti Bhawan
  Raag Desh (2017) as Kailash Nath Katju Baraat Company (2017)as father of ProtagonistBatla House (2019) as Shivraj PatilThe Accidental Prime Minister  (film) (2019) as Shivraj PatilChintoo Ji (2009) as Pundit JeeShort film Aathwan (2017) in lead role of a Dementia patient
 Sitapur The City Of Gangster (2021)
 Ittu See Baat (2021)
 Mohe Pyar Ke Rang Men Rang Sajna (2021), a Bhojpuri Film
 Bhavai (2021) 
 Alingan (2022) 
 Banchhada (2022) Acting Ka Bhoot (2022)
(All 2021 films are to be released)

TV Commercials KBC Promo Yahan Paise Hi Nahin Dil Bhi Jeete Jate Hain (2015)Kala Hit Kone men Jhadu ke itne paise ( 2018-20)Hero Motor Bike( 2014)
 Symphoni Fan (2016)

 Main Awards Yash Bharti (2017) UP Sangeet Natak Academy Fellow (2008) UP sangeet Natak Academy Award (1984) Awadh Samman''(2019)

References

External links 

Year of birth missing (living people)
Living people
Indian male television actors
Indian male stage actors
Male actors from Lucknow
Place of birth missing (living people)
Male actors in Hindi television
Male actors in Hindi cinema
21st-century Indian male actors